Petrusburg is a small mixed farming town in the Free State province of South Africa. It started out as a Dutch Reformed Church serving the farms in 1891. When it became a town, it was originally started on a farm close to "Emmaus", a railway station on the line between Bloemfontein and Kimberley. The original foundations are still there, but they ran out of water, and had to move to the present location where a strong fountain was available. So much so that the first houses had free running water from the fountain for irrigation. The town was named after Petrus Albertus Venter, whose farm, Diepfontein, provided the original land. It is situated on the N8 National Route between Bloemfontein (80 km east) and Kimberley (80 km west).

Every year in March, a big music festival is held called the Aartappelfees (Potato Festival). The main street in town is Pretorius Street, but the busiest street is Ossewa street.

A. J. C. Jooste High School is a coeducational boarding high school. Together with the associated primary school it is known as the AJC Jooste Combined School.

Poverty is high in the area with an estimated 64,8% of the population is unemployed, the main employment has been agricultural sector.

Bolokanang is the name of the location and it has a population of about 8300 people leaving there. Boiketlo street is the Main Street and the entrance point of Bolokanang.

The most popular taverns used are Kenny's Tavern, Kiss 2 Kiss, Kilowatt and they all contributed in the huge amount of crime in the area.

References

Populated places in the Letsemeng Local Municipality
Populated places established in 1891
1891 establishments in South Africa